The following is a list of people who have contributed to the Kurdish literature. This list is not comprehensive, but is continuously being expanded and includes Kurdish writers and poets from Iran (Persia), Iraq, Turkey (Ottoman Empire), Syria, Russia (Soviet Union), and European countries.

8th century – 9th century 
 Jaban al-Kurdi
 Shaykh Khalil al-Kurdi as-Sammani (?-750) Islamic mystic, Muslim ulama and Tabi‘un.

11th century 
 Ali Hariri (Elî Herîrî) (1009–1079), Kurdish poet

12th century 
 Ali ibn al-Athir (1160–1233), Kurdish/Islamic historian, born in Jazira (Cizîre) region
Fakhraddin, Yezidi saint, philosopher, poet and scholar
 Saladin (1137–1193)

13th century 
 Ibn al-Salah (1181-1245)
 Fakhr al-Din al-Akhlati

14th century 
 Mala Pareshan (1356-1416)
 Abu'l Fida (1273-1331) Kurdish, the crater Abulfeda on the Moon is named after him
 Masud ibn Namdar
 Al-Shahrazuri
 Zain al-Din al-'Iraqi (1325-1404)

15th century
Mela Hesenê Bateyî (Melayê Batê), (1417–1491), Kurdish poet and Muslim cleric, Hakkari region
Idris Bitlisi

16th century
 Malaye Jaziri (Melayê Cizîrî), (1570–1640), Kurdish poet and Sufi
 Sherefxan Bidlisi (1543–1599), historian and poet, author of Sharafnama

17th century
 Faqi Tayran (Feqiyê Teyran), (1590–1660), poet, author of Sheik San'an and Battle of DimDim
 Ali Taramakhi (Eliyê Teremaxî), (1591-1653), linguist and writer
 Mustafa Besarani, (1642–1701), Kurdish poet

 Ahmad Khani (Ehmedê Xanî), (1651–1707) Kurdish writer, poet, astronomer and philosopher, author of Mem û Zîn

18th century
 Khana Qubadi (Xana Qubadî), (1700–1759), Kurdish poet, author of Şîrîn û Xesrew
 Mahmud Bayazidi (1797–1859), Kurdish writer, translator and historian
 Nalî (1797–1869), Kurdish mathematician poet
 Khâlid-i Baghdâdî

19th century
 Mastoura Ardalan (1805–1848), Kurdish poet and historiographer
 Mawlawi Tawagozi (1806–1882), Kurdish poet and Sufi
 Haji Qadir Koyi (1817–1897), Kurdish poet
 Mahwi (1830–1906), Kurdish poet and Sufi
 Sheikh Rezza Talabani (1835–1910), Kurdish, Iraq
 Wafaei (1844–1902), Kurdish poet, Iran
 Edeb (1860–1918), Kurdish poet, Iran
 Piramerd (1867–1950), Kurdish poet, writer, novelist and journalist, Iraqi Kurdistan
 Mulla Effendi (1863 - December 31, 1942), Islamic philosopher, scholar, astronomer, and politician
 Said Kurdi (1876–1960), Kurdish Islamic philosopher, Turkey
 Hajj Nematollah (1871–1919), mystic and poet
 Zewar (1875-1948), writer and poet

20th and 21st century

 Muhamed Amin Zaki (1880–1948), writer, historian and politician, Iraqi Kurdistan
 Taufiq Wahby (1891–1984), writer and linguist, Iraq
 Celadet Bedir Khan (Celadet Alî Bedirxan), (1893–1951), linguist, journalist and politician, founder of the Latin-based Kurdish alphabet
 Nuri Barzinji (1896–1958), poet, Iraqi Kurdistan
 Arab Shamilov (Erebê Şemo) (1897–1978), Kurdish writer and novelist, Armenia
 Rafiq Hilmi (1898–1960), Kurdish writer, literary analyst and politician, Iraq
 Cigerxwîn (Cegerxwîn), (1903–1984), Kurdish poet and writer, Turkey/Syria
 Abdulla Goran (1904–1962), Kurdish poet
 Osman Sabri (1905–1993), Kurdish poet, writer and journalist, Turkey/Syria
 Emînê Evdal (1906–1964), Kurdish writer and linguist, Armenia
 Alaaddin Sajadi (1907–1984), Kurdish writer, poet and academic, Iraqi Kurdistan
 Nado Makhmudov (1907-1990), Kurdish writer and public figure, Armenia
 Hecîyê Cindî (1908–1990), Kurdish writer, linguist and researcher, Armenia
 Qanate Kurdo (1909–1985), Kurdish writer, linguist and academic, Russia
 Qedrîcan (1911–1972), Kurdish poet and writer, Turkey/Syria
 Ibrahim Ahmad (1914–2000), Kurdish writer, novelist and translator, Iraqi Kurdistan/England
 Dildar, (Yonis Reuf), (1917–1948), Kurdish poet, Iraq
 Hejar (Abdurrahman Sharafkandi), (1920–1990), Kurdish poet, writer, translator and linguist, Iran
 Hemin Mukriyani (Hêmin Mukriyanî), (1921–1986), Kurdish journalist and poet, Iran
 Ahmad Hardi (1922–2006), Kurdish poet, Iraqi Kurdistan/UK
 Karim Hisami (1926–2001), Kurdish writer, Iran/Iraq/Sweden
 Muhamad Salih Dilan (1927–1990), One of the founders of modern Kurdish poetry
 Shamil Asgarov (1928–2005), poet, researcher on the history and culture of the Kurds in Azerbaijan, translator
 Mahmud Baksi (1944–2001), Kurdish writer and journalist, Sweden
 Rauf Hassan (born 1945), Kurdish writer and journalist, Iraqi Kurdistan
 Rojen Barnas (born 1945), Kurdish poet and writer, Sweden
 Azad Zal (born 1972), Kurdish poet, writer, journalist, translator and linguist, Kurdistan
 Abdulla Pashew (born 1946), contemporary Kurdish poet
 Şahînê Bekirê Soreklî (born 1946), Kurdish writer, poet and translator, Australia
 Reşo Zîlan (born 1947), Kurdish writer, translator and linguist, Sweden
 Latif Halmat (born 1947), Kurdish poet, Iraqi Kurdistan
 Keça Kurd (born 1948), poet, writer and linguist, Germany
 Cankurd (born 1948), Kurdish writer and poet, Germany
 Têmûrê Xelîl (born 1949), translator and journalist, Sweden
 Rafiq Sabir (born 1950), Kurdish poet, Sweden
 Farhad Shakely (born 1951), poet, writer and academic, Sweden
 Khalil Rashow (born 1952), Kurdish writer and academic, Germany
 Pîr Xidir Silêman (born 1952), Kurdish writer, teacher and parliamentarian, Iraqi Kurdistan
 Mehmed Uzun (1953–2007), writer and novelist, Turkey/Sweden
 Jalal Barzanji (born 1953), writer, poet and journalist, Canada
 Fawaz Hussain (born 1953), writer and translator, France
 Zeynelabidin Zinar (born 1953), Kurdish writer, researcher and specialist in Kurdish folklore, Sweden
 Yekta Uzunoglu (born 1953), Kurdish writer, translator and entrepreneur, Czech Republic/Germany
 Najiba Ahmad (born 1954), Kurdish writer and poet, Iraq/Iran
 Perwîz Cîhanî (born 1955), Kurdish writer, poet and novelist, Switzerland
 Hesenê Metê (born 1957), Kurdish writer, novelist and translator, Sweden
 Mustafa Aydogan (born 1957), Writer, novelist and translator, Sweden
 Firat Cewerî (born 1959), Kurdish writer, translator and journalist, Sweden
 Serdar Roşan (born 1959), writer, poet and translator, Sweden
 Ata Nahai (born 1960), writer and novelist, Iran
 Farhad Pirbal (born 1961), Kurdish writer and academic, Iraqi Kurdistan
 Nazand Begikhani (born 1964), Kurdish writer, poet and researcher, UK
 Mahabad Qaradaghi (born 1966), Kurdish writer, poet and translator, Sweden
 Kajal Ahmad (born 1967), Kurdish poet, writer and journalist, Iraqi Kurdistan
 Choman Hardi (born 1974), Kurdish poet, researcher and painter, UK
 Jalal Dabagh (born 1939), Kurdish writer and journalist, Sweden
 Zeki Majed (born 1996) Kurdish poet and film director, Bulgaria

See also
 Kurdish people
 List of Kurdish people
 List of Kurdish poets and authors
 Kurdistan
 Sharafnama
 Mem and Zin

References 

Kurdish

Lists of Asian scientists